van der Haar or Vander Haar is a surname. Notable people with the surname include:

Albert van der Haar (born 1975), Dutch footballer
Paul Vander Haar (born 1958), Australian rules footballer
Ru van der Haar (1913–1943), Dutch field hockey player

Dutch-language surnames
Surnames of Dutch origin